David Kidston (2 October 1859 – 27 June 1909) was a Scottish international rugby union player. He played as a full back.

He played for Glasgow Academicals, one of the top teams in Scotland at the time.

He was called up for the Glasgow District side for the 1881 provincial match, the 'inter-city'  against Edinburgh District on 3 December 1881.

He was called up to the Scotland squad and played Wales at Raeburn Place, Edinburgh on 8 January 1883. He was later called up for the England match that same season on 3 March 1883.

References

External links
ESPN Stats

1859 births
1909 deaths
Scottish rugby union players
Scotland international rugby union players
Rugby union players from Glasgow
History of rugby union in Scotland
Glasgow Academicals rugby union players
Glasgow District (rugby union) players
Rugby union fullbacks